Stanley Cawtheray (11 February 1906 – 28 November 1989) was an association football player who represented New Zealand at international level.

Cawtheray made two appearances in official internationals for the All Whites, the first a 1–7 loss to Australia on 4 July 1936, while his second match, losing 0–10 to Australia on 11 July 1936, still stands as New Zealand's biggest loss in official matches, although New Zealand have been beaten by more in unofficial matches, notably England Amateurs in 1937 and Manchester United in 1967.

References 

1906 births
1989 deaths
New Zealand association footballers
New Zealand international footballers
Association footballers not categorized by position